The Garfield County Library District is a public library system in western Colorado, United States.

The library district serves the unincorporated areas in Garfield County, Colorado. Additionally, the library district partners with cities and towns to manage their libraries. The district operates 6 libraries. In 2019, the district had 580,725 visitors and checked out 362,164 books, eBooks, magazines, and media (DVDs, CDs, audiobooks). The district also hosts many events, mostly for children.

Branches
The library system contains six branches, all introduced between 1938 and 1980.
Carbondale Library (1964), Carbondale
Glenwood Springs Library (1969), Glenwood Springs
New Castle Library (1938), New Castle
Parachute Library (1982), Parachute
Rifle Library (1976), Rifle
Silt Library (1980), Silt

History
The first library in the district was established in 1938 as a Works Progress Administration (WPA) project in New Castle, Colorado. This library served the entire county and had about 14,000 books. The Garfield County Commissioners took over funding the library system after the WPA was discontinued.

References

External links

 Garfield County Library District

Public libraries in Colorado
County library systems in Colorado